Point of Rocks is a cliff in Morton County, Kansas which was one of three landmarks by the same name on the Santa Fe Trail. This one was on the Cimarron Cutoff. It is now part of Cimarron National Grassland.

The bluff overlooks the north side of the Cimarron River and lies approximately seven miles north of Elkhart west of K-27.
Point of Rocks has been an important landmark for travelers to this region of Kansas. It signifies the closeness of springs and thus water. Many springs are known to exist in the region of the Cimarron River near Point of Rocks. Because of this, Point of Rocks was an important landmark for travelers heading west on the Cimarron Cutoff and for modern day ranchers. Point of Rocks is the third Highest Point in the state of Kansas with the elevation at its summit being .

Point of Rocks-Middle Spring Santa Fe Trail Historic District, which includes the cliff, a spring, and four Santa Fe trail segments, is listed on the National Register of Historic Places.

An overlook on the Point of Rocks looks out over former Point of Rocks ranch area.  The overlook includes interpretative displays.

A DAR monument was placed on the Point of Rocks in April 1914.  Soon after, on May 1, 1914, the a flood of the Cimarron River destroyed hay and numerous buildings of the Point of Rocks ranch, as well as drowning two daughters of the Brite family.

The district was added to the National Register on April 10, 2013.

References

External links
Point of Rocks
Point of Rocks Landmark Area

Geography of Kansas
Protected areas of Morton County, Kansas
Santa Fe Trail